Thiago Soares Alves (born July 26, 1986) is a Brazilian volleyball player, who is a wing spiker and has competed for Fenerbahçe Grundig and the national team. He competed at the 2012 Summer Olympics, where Brazil reached the final, winning the silver medal.

Clubs

References 

1986 births
Living people
Brazilian men's volleyball players
Volleyball players at the 2012 Summer Olympics
Olympic silver medalists for Brazil
Olympic medalists in volleyball
Olympic volleyball players of Brazil
Medalists at the 2012 Summer Olympics
Fenerbahçe volleyballers
Volleyball players at the 2011 Pan American Games
Pan American Games gold medalists for Brazil
Pan American Games medalists in volleyball
Medalists at the 2011 Pan American Games
Outside hitters
Sportspeople from Porto Alegre